John J. Spoltore (January 21, 1921 – December 11, 1973) was an American Republican Party politician who served as chairman of the New Jersey Republican State Committee in 1973.

Biography 
He was born on January 21, 1921, in Pennsylvania. Before entering politics, Spoltore operated a dry-cleaning store in Bridgeton, New Jersey. He was Mayor of Bridgeton from 1953 to 1957. He served as chairman of the Bridgeton Republican Committee for fifteen years and the Cumberland County Republican Committee for six years.

After the U.S. Supreme Court, in Reynolds v. Sims (more commonly known as One Man, One Vote), required redistricting by state legislatures for congressional districts to keep represented populations equal, as well as requiring both houses of state legislatures to have districts drawn that contained roughly equal populations, and to perform redistricting when needed, Spoltore became a candidate for the New Jersey State Senate. He challenged three-term Democratic incumbent John A. Waddington. Because of its population, Salem and Cumberland counties were merged into one district with one Senator. Waddington won by 7,902 votes, 32,292 (56.92%)	to 24,390 (42.99%). Spoltore lost in Salem County by a 2–1 margin, and lost Cumberland by a narrow 577 vote margin.

In June 1973, Spoltore replaced John E. Dimon as chairman of the New Jersey Republican State Committee. He was the selection of Charles W. Sandman, Jr., who was then the Republican candidate for Governor of New Jersey. Spoltore had served on Sandman's staff in the House of Representatives.

On December 11, 1973 Spoltore died of a heart attack at St. Francis Hospital in Trenton, New Jersey at the age of 52.

References

External links 
 Biographical information for John J. Spoltore from The Political Graveyard

1921 births
1973 deaths
Chairmen of the New Jersey Republican State Committee
Mayors of places in New Jersey
New Jersey Republicans
People from Bridgeton, New Jersey
20th-century American politicians